KFSI (92.9 FM) is a Christian radio station in Rochester, Minnesota.

History
KFSI was started in 1981 by the Rev. Ray Logan. The Station plays contemporary Christian music as well as some teaching programs. This station was originally heard on 88.5 MHz, but moved to 92.9 in 1993 because they were causing interference with local television station, KAAL from (Austin). The KFSI broadcast tower is located west of Rochester.

External links
KFSI official website

Contemporary Christian radio stations in the United States
Moody Radio affiliate stations
Radio stations established in 1981
1981 establishments in Minnesota
Christian radio stations in Minnesota